Mikael Pernfors was the defending champion but lost in the first round to Kevin Curren.

Ivan Lendl won in the final 6–2, 6–3, against Stefan Edberg.

Seeds

  Ivan Lendl (champion)
  Stefan Edberg (final)
  Jimmy Connors (first round)
  Thomas Muster (second round)
  Emilio Sánchez (semifinals)
  Brad Gilbert (quarterfinals)
  Mikael Pernfors (first round)
  Andrei Chesnokov (second round)

Draw

Finals

Top half

Bottom half

External links
 Main draw

Singles